Laura Polli (born 7 September 1983) is a female racewalker from Switzerland. She competed in the women's 20 kilometres walk event at the 2015 World Championships in Athletics in Beijing, China, and finished in the 33rd position.

See also
 Switzerland at the 2015 World Championships in Athletics

References

Swiss female racewalkers
Living people
Place of birth missing (living people)
1983 births
World Athletics Championships athletes for Switzerland